Star for a Night is a 1936 American drama film directed by Lewis Seiler and starring Claire Trevor, Jane Darwell and Arline Judge.

The film's sets were designed by the art director Duncan Cramer.

Partial cast

References

Bibliography
 Goble, Alan. The Complete Index to Literary Sources in Film. Walter de Gruyter, 1999.

External links
 

1936 films
1936 drama films
American drama films
Films directed by Lewis Seiler
20th Century Fox films
American black-and-white films
Films scored by Samuel Kaylin
1930s English-language films
1930s American films